Parahepomidion is a genus of longhorn beetles of the subfamily Lamiinae, containing the following species:

 Parahepomidion burgeoni Breuning, 1936
 Parahepomidion fossulatum Breuning, 1936
 Parahepomidion granulatum (Aurivillius, 1908)
 Parahepomidion granulipenne Breuning, 1955
 Parahepomidion meruanum Breuning, 1958
 Parahepomidion nitidum (Aurivillius, 1916)

References

Phrissomini